Fred Essler (born Fritz Essler; 13 February 1895 – 17 January 1973) was an American actor. He worked film, television and on stage.

He was born Fritz Essler, on 13 February 1895 in Vienna, Austria-Hungary, (now Austria); and, died on, 17 January 1973 in Woodland Hills, California.

Selected filmography

The following is a partial list  of his film work: Some of the trailers for the movies are also available for viewing on-line.

The Money Trap (1966), Mr. Klein
The Unsinkable Molly Brown (1964), Baron Karl Ludwig von Ettenburg
G.I. Blues (1960) Papa Mueller
My Man Godfrey (1957), Captain
My Gun Is Quick (1957), Ludwig Teller
Hot Rod Girl (1956), Yo-Yo
The Benny Goodman Story (1956), Professor Schoepp
The First Traveling Saleslady (1956) Martin Schlessinger
The Girl in the Red Velvet Swing (1955), Leopold Borner (uncredited)
Conquest of Space (1955), Assistant Station Announcer (uncredited)
Houdini (1953), Officious Man (uncredited)
The Admiral Was a Lady (1950), Benny
The White Tower (1950), Knubel
Every Girl Should Be Married (1948), Pierre
 Messenger of Peace (1947), Hans Dacher
Faithful in My Fashion (1946), Nikolai
Scarlet Street (1946), Marchetti (uncredited) 
The Song of Bernadette (1943), Minister of Justice (uncredited)

Selected Television Credits
The following is a partial list of his television work:

I'm Dickens, He's Fenster; Is There a Doctor in the House? (1963), Dr. Leipsig
The Dick Powell Show; The Rage of Silence (1963) … Mr. Potovsky
77 Sunset Strip; The Catspaw Caper (1962); Papa E; The Reluctant Spy (1962), Max 
Cheyenne; Man Alone (1962), Carl Turner
Mister Ed; The Contest (1962), Mr. Schultz
Pete and Gladys; The Great Stone Face (1961), Otto Inglehoffer
Stagecoach West; Three Wise Men (1960), Adolph Strauss
Perry Mason; The Case of the Nine Dolls (1960), Mr. Kringle
Peter Gunn; The Dummy (1960), Mr. Ulrich
Alfred Hitchcock Presents; Cheap Is Cheap,  Arthur
Maverick; Game of Chance (1959), Jeweller
Shirley Temple's Storybook; The Legend of Sleepy Hollow (1958), Baltus Van Tassel
My Little Margie; Switzerland Story (1954)
The Adventures of Falcon; A Drug on the Market (1954), Adolph Beimer
The Lone Ranger; Trouble in Town (1953), Otto Heindorf
Adventures of Superman; The Monkey Mystery (1952), Scientist Jan Moleska (uncredited)
Sky King; Formula for Fear (1952), Dr. Roy Urban
Dangerous Assignment; The Black Hood Story (1952), Poppa Schlager
Racket Squad (1951-2), Karl Muller
The Stu Erwin Show (1951)

Stage
From Vienna, 1939, Original Cast, Musical Revue

References

External links

Fred Essler, partial list of videos available, for free download, at Internet Archive

American male film actors
American male television actors
Austro-Hungarian emigrants to the United States
1895 births
1973 deaths
20th-century American male actors